"Marge vs. Singles, Seniors, Childless Couples and Teens, and Gays" is the eighth episode of the fifteenth season of the American animated television series The Simpsons. It originally aired on the Fox network in the United States on January 4, 2004. After Lindsay Naegle forms an anti-children group, Marge fights back with a group led with Mr. Burns' power. It was written by Jon Vitti and directed by Bob Anderson.

This episode earned Nielsen ratings of 6.7/10.

Plot 
When Bart and Lisa fight over what to watch on TV, they accidentally change the channel to a show hosted by a children's singer and guitarist named Roofi, a parody of Canadian-Armenian children's singer/songwriter Raffi Cavoukian. This does not appeal to Bart and Lisa, but Maggie adores the show, and after Bart and Lisa accidentally say there is a CD so that they can get the TV back, Marge buys the disc and plays it everywhere, much to the annoyance of Bart, Lisa, and Homer, all the while Marge is oblivious to their feelings due to pleasing obsessed Maggie. Marge goes as far as to even buy tickets to the concert, which is to be held at Cletus Spuckler's farm, in a parody version of the original Woodstock concert.  However, because the concert was oversold, it ends up packed, and the Teletubbies are the opening act, dismissed by Marge as repetitive. As it starts to rain, Roofi appears on stage to sing "The Nonsense Song", but is then hit in the face with a baby bottle, abruptly cuts the show short and gets on a helicopter. Soon, the babies riot against the police sent to contain them, an event referred to in the news as the "Tot Offensive", as reported by Kent Brockman.

In a response to the disaster, all the adults of Springfield who do not have children (single people, the elderly, couples who do not have children, teenagers, and homosexuals) are up in arms, because Kabul has declared they will no longer be Springfield's sister city and Mayor Quimby forcibly takes $1 million from the audience to cover the damages. Lindsay Naegle arrives to form an anti-youth group named "Singles, Seniors, Childless Couples and Teens and Gays Against Parasitic Parents" (SSCCATAGAPP) to rid the town of anything that provides comfort to families. A statue to America's deadbeat dads is erected, a school bus ignores kids waiting at the stop to take senior citizens on a gambling junket, and a new ordinance allows children who act up in public to be tasered.

A furious Marge lobbies to get an initiative: "Families Come First", as she lobbies "Proud Parents Against Singles, Seniors, Childless Couples and Teens, and Gays" (PPASSCCATAG). Her lobbying efforts do poorly at first, and she fends off a $50,000 offer from America's tobacco lobby, but fair support grows after Mr. Burns loans his signature on Marge's petition because he cares about children (specifically, their "supple young organs"). Other Springfield residents follow his lead, and Proposition 242 gets on the ballot. When the opposition slanders Marge with an ad where an actress posing as Marge says even she is against Prop 242, Homer tries to help with the campaign but screws up badly by placing the wrong information on bumper stickers and buttons for the voters, and his Rudy Giuliani-featuring advertisement is also a disaster. Bart and Lisa soon concoct a plan. When everyone goes to the voting polls, they are stopped in their tracks by the (literally) infectious hugs of children. Proposition 242 passes easily, and Homer decides to celebrate by dumping his kids at an R-rated movie with no supervision while he and Marge go to some nice place by themselves.

Production
TBA

Critical reception
CinemaSentries gave the show a positive review, writing "Marge Vs. Singles, Seniors, Childless Couples and Teens and Gays is a great example of the way the show used to be able to find hilarity in mocking both sides of an issue when it spoofs both the grueling life of a parent and the grueling lives of those without children who have to put up with the problems caused by other people's kids."

References

External links

 Marge vs. Singles, Seniors, Childless Couples and Teens, and Gays script at Springfield, Springfield!

The Simpsons (season 15) episodes
2004 American television episodes
Television episodes about ageism
Television episodes about elections